Todd Buchanan (born March 1, 1967) is an American college basketball coach and former head coach of the Houston Cougars women's basketball team.

Career
He was the sixth head coach of the Houston Cougars, and officially began in that position on April 20, 2010, resigning on December 21, 2013. Prior to his appointment with Houston, he served as the head coach of Houston Baptist, where he transitioned the team from the NAIA to Division I of the NCAA. In his first season as head coach at Houston, Buchanan achieved the second best season record in the program's history, and the best ever as a first year coach for the program.

From 2000 through 2005, Buchanan served as an associate head coach for Houston under coach Joe Curl.

He is a graduate of Murray State University where he was a member of Alpha Gamma Rho fraternity.

Head coaching record

References

External links
Profile at Houston

Living people
Houston Cougars women's basketball coaches
Houston Christian Huskies women's basketball coaches
East Carolina Pirates women's basketball coaches
Murray State Racers women's basketball coaches
Montevallo Falcons women's basketball coaches
Murray State University alumni
1967 births
Place of birth missing (living people)
American women's basketball coaches